Abdullah Ahmad Badawi formed the third Abdullah cabinet after being invited by Tuanku Mizan Zainal Abidin to begin a new government following the 8 March 2008 general election in Malaysia. It was the 17th cabinet of Malaysia formed since independence. Prior to the election, Abdullah led (as Prime Minister) the second Abdullah cabinet, a coalition government that consisted of members of the component parties of Barisan Nasional.

This is a list of the members of the third cabinet of the fifth Prime Minister of Malaysia, Abdullah Ahmad Badawi.

Composition

Full members
The federal cabinet consisted of the following ministers:

Deputy ministers

See also
 Members of the Dewan Rakyat, 12th Malaysian Parliament

Cabinet of Malaysia
2008 establishments in Malaysia
2009 disestablishments in Malaysia
Cabinets established in 2008
Cabinets disestablished in 2009